Pierre Succar (born 15 June 1960) is a Lebanese alpine skier. He competed in two events at the 1988 Winter Olympics.

References

1960 births
Living people
Lebanese male alpine skiers
Olympic alpine skiers of Lebanon
Alpine skiers at the 1988 Winter Olympics
Place of birth missing (living people)